Mordred is the son and usurper of King Arthur in the Arthurian legend.

Mordred may also refer to:

Mordred (comics), a Marvel Comics character, adversary of the Black Knight
Mordred Deschain, a character from Stephen King's The Dark Tower series
Mordred (band), an American thrash/funk metal band from San Francisco
Mordred (manga), a character from Fate/Apocrypha as Saber of Red

See also
Modred the Mystic, another Marvel Comics character